The Departmental Council of Pas-de-Calais is the deliberative assembly of the French department of Pas-de-Calais.

Presidents 

 Jean-Claude Leroy

References 

Pas-de-Calais
Pas-de-Calais